The Pluto Moment is a 2018 Chinese drama film directed by Ming Zhang. It was selected to screen in the Directors' Fortnight section at the 2018 Cannes Film Festival.

Cast
 Miya Muqi as Gao Li
 Wang Xuebing as Wang Zhun 
 Zeng Meihuizi as Chun Tai
 Liu Dan as Ding Hongmin

References

External links
 

2018 films
2018 drama films
Chinese drama films
2010s Mandarin-language films